Kyöstilä is a Finnish surname.

Notable people with the surname include:
 Heikki Kyöstilä (born 1946), Finnish billionaire, and the founder, owner and president of dental equipment maker Planmeca
 Lauri Kyöstilä (1896–1984), Finnish diver who competed in the 1920 and 1924 Summer Olympics in the platform event

Finnish-language surnames